The West Coast Junior Lacrosse League, or WCJLL is a Junior B Tier 2 box lacrosse league based in the Lower Mainland of British Columbia, Canada, sanctioned by the British Columbia Lacrosse Association. The league is one of two Tier 2 Junior B level leagues in British Columbia.

History
Beginning with the 2018 season, 17 and 18 year old lacrosse was merged with Junior B, expanding the bracket to the age brackets used by the rest of the Canadian Lacrosse Association. WCJLL is one of two Tier 2 leagues (Pacific Northwest Junior Lacrosse League) in the province. Two teams from each league go head-to-head in the postseason at the British Columbia Tier 2 Provincials.

Westshore Bears hosted the Provincials in 2018 defeating Coquitlam Adanacs in the Bronze medal game 9-6. Port Moody Thunder would take the Silver medal with a 12-9 overtime loss to the Cowichan Valley Thunder.

Teams

Champions

British Columbia Tier 2 Provincials

See also
British Columbia Junior Tier 1 Lacrosse League
Pacific Northwest Junior Lacrosse League (Tier 2)
Thompson Okanagan Junior Lacrosse League (Tier 1)

References

External links
WCJLL website
BCLA website

Sport in Vancouver
5
Youth sport in Canada